Rodney Ramone Hill Jr. (born December 28, 1979), better known by his stage name Rocko, is an American rapper.

Rocko released his first and only major studio album, Self Made, in 2008 through a joint venture with Island Records. The album peaked at number 21 on the US Billboard 200, number 6 on Top R&B/Hip-Hop Albums and number 4 on Top Rap Albums. It spawned the single "Umma Do Me", which peaked at number 66 on the US Billboard Hot 100.

In 2010, Hill founded the A1 Recordings record label and signed fellow Atlanta artist Future, who would come to achieve worldwide success. His 2013 single "U.O.E.N.O." (featuring Future and Rick Ross) peaked at number 20 on the Billboard Hot 100. Future released his last album with the A1 label, Hndrxx in 2017.

Musical career

1999–2008: Career beginnings and Self Made 
Rocko started out as a ghostwriter and producer somewhere around 1999. In 2002, he established his own label Rocky Road Records and began working with artists like rapper and singer, AL Young Dro ,and Dem Franchize Boyz. He released several mixtapes before being signed by L.A. Reid to Def Jam Records in October 2006.

He released his first studio album, Self Made on March 18, 2008. It featured production from Drumma Boy, Cool & Dre, The Runners and J.U.S.T.I.C.E. League and contributions came from guest artists Lloyd, Dre, Kevin Cossom as well as Monica. The album spawned the single "Umma Do Me", his first single had managed to get on the Billboard Hot 100.

2010–present: Mixtape circuit 
His second studio album One of One was originally meant to be released on Def Jam. However, this never happened, as he parted ways with Def Jam, looking for better label situations. He subsequently formed his own label, A-1 Recordings. On March 1, 2010, he released the mixtape Wild Life, as a result of the positive feedback for the mixtape, Rocko re-released it as an album.

On February 9, 2011, Rocko released his mixtape Rocko Dinero. On November 24, 2011, he released the mixtape Gift of Gab, the mixtape spawned Rocko's single "Squares Out Your Circle" with his A1 artist Future.

On October 25, 2012, Rocko released the mixtape Wordplay.

On January 26, 2013, it was announced that Rocko was considering joining his old business partner L.A. Reid's label Epic which is also home to his friend and artist Future, but intimating he was not quite sure. On February 16, 2013, he released Gift of Gab 2; the mixtape is known for the controversial single "U.O.E.N.O." featuring Future & Rick Ross. The song made a "Hot Shot Debut" on the Hot R&B/Hip-Hop Songs chart at #44 and has peaked at #14. "U.O.E.N.O." also peaked at #20 on the Hot 100, becoming his first top 40 hit. Also On February 16, 2013, it was announced that Rocko inked in a distribution deal with E1 Music for his label A1, and that his believed mixtape Seeing Is Believing will now be his forthcoming second studio album and it will not be entitled One of One. On March 25, 2013, Rocko hinted of a possible collaboration album between him and Future. Rocko's next upcoming mixtapes to promote Seeing Is Believing, is Wordplay 2 and #IGNANT.

On February 7, 2014, Rocko released his mixtape Lingo 4 Dummys. On May 29, 2014, Rocko released an extended play (EP) entitled Poet in dedication of the passing of Maya Angelou. The EP, which features a guest appearance from Nas, was originally released for free online, but later added to the iTunes Store via A-1 Recordings. On October 15, 2014, Rocko released his mixtape IGNANT. On November 27, 2014, Rocko released his mixtape FOOD.

On February 20, 2015, Rocko released his mixtape Expect the Unexpected. On July 2, 2015, he released his mixtape Real Spill.

Controversy

U.O.E.N.O. lyrics 
In a line on Rocko's song "U.O.E.N.O.", fellow rapper Rick Ross raps the line, "Put molly all in her champagne/ She ain't even know it/ I took her home and I enjoyed that/ She ain't even know it." A petition containing 72,000 signatures was presented to Reebok, demanding they drop Ross as a spokesman for the lyrics which appeared to condone date rape. Ross has apologized for the lyrics, claiming they weren't about rape. He was dropped by Reebok on April 11, 2013. Rocko later dropped the Rick Ross verse in order to get radio play.

Lawsuit 
In June 2016, Hill filed a $10 million lawsuit against his A1 Recordings artist, Future. According to Hill, Future breached his contractual obligation to release 6 albums under the label. Neither artist has announced the settlement.

Other ventures

A1 Recordings 

A1 Recordings, formerly known as Rocky Road Records, is an Atlanta-based record label formed in 2010 by Hill. On February 16, 2013, it was announced that A1 Recordings will be distributed by E1 Music.

Current artist
 Rocko

Former artist
 Future

Releases

Discography 

 Self Made (2008)

Filmography

Films 
 2015: The Spot (as Lehgo)

Television 
 2009: Monica: Still Standing (guest stars as himself)
 2013: Love & Hip Hop: Atlanta season 2 (stars as himself)
 2013: T.I. and Tiny: The Family Hustle (guest stars as himself)

References

External links 
 Rocko at the Island website

1979 births
Living people
African-American businesspeople
African-American male actors
African-American male rappers
American male film actors
American music industry executives
Place of birth missing (living people)
Businesspeople from Georgia (U.S. state)
Def Jam Recordings artists
Male actors from Atlanta
Rappers from Atlanta
Southern hip hop musicians
21st-century American rappers
21st-century American male musicians
21st-century African-American musicians
20th-century African-American people